The USL Championship (USLC) is a professional men's soccer league in the United States that began its inaugural season in 2011. The USL is sanctioned by the United States Soccer Federation (U.S. Soccer) as a Division II league since 2017, placing it under Major League Soccer (Division I) in the hierarchy. The USL is headquartered in Tampa, Florida.

The league is owned and operated by United Soccer League and was formed as result of the merger of their USL First (USL-1) and Second Divisions (USL-2), following the 2010 season which saw neither the USL-1 nor the North American Soccer League (NASL) receive Division II sanctioning from the USSF, resulting in the temporary USSF Division 2 Pro League. United Soccer Leagues stated that the merger would strengthen the league's position within the American professional soccer landscape through stability, commercial growth and the professional development of soccer in four main regions throughout the United States and Canada.

History

Founding (2010)

On September 8, 2010, the United Soccer Leagues formally announced the creation of USL Pro in a press release.
Prior to the official announcement of the new league, on August 11, 2010, the Dayton Dutch Lions FC revealed they would be joining the "USL-Pro Championship Division (former USL-2)" at a press conference, revealing the name of the new league before its official announcement. With this disclosure, the Dutch Lions were the first confirmed team in USL Pro for its inaugural 2011 season.
Alongside the announcement of the new league, the Richmond Kickers revealed they would be moving to USL Pro for 2011. With the departure of the Portland Timbers to MLS in 2011 and the defection of the Puerto Rico Islanders to the NASL from USL-1, the Austin Aztex were the only remaining USL-1 team not yet a part of USL Pro.

On September 22, 2010, the "Caribbean Division" of USL Pro was announced, with teams from Puerto Rico and Antigua and Barbuda signing on to compete in the league. With the addition of Puerto Rico United to the league and "Caribbean Division", league representatives expressed their intent to see expansion in the region continue, with an eventual 8-team "Caribbean Conference". With the inclusion of a team from Los Angeles, this division eventually became the International Division.
On September 22, 2010, USL announced that Sevilla FC Puerto Rico and River Plate Puerto Rico would be joining USL Pro in 2011 alongside Antigua Barracuda FC as part of the building blocks of a Caribbean division.
On September 28, 2010, USL announced that one of their flagship clubs and reigning 2010 USL-2 Champions, the Charleston Battery, would be joining USL Pro for its launch in 2011.
On September 30, 2010, nearly two months following the team's own announcement of a "USL Pro Championship Division" move, the USL formally announced Dayton Dutch Lions FC would join USL Pro.
On October 4 and 7, 2010, the USL revealed two USL-2 clubs, the Charlotte Eagles and the Harrisburg City Islanders (later known as Penn FC), would be making the jump to USL Pro for 2011.

The Pittsburgh Riverhounds were added as the 9th official team on October 22, 2010. October 25, 2010, saw the addition of the Rochester Rhinos who had previously committed to the NASL, along with expansion team Orlando City SC (formerly the Austin Aztex FC of USL-1) after new ownership secured and moved the team from Texas to Florida.

On November 9, 2010, former USL-2 side Wilmington Hammerheads officially joined the league as the 12th team, followed on November 17, 2010, by F.C. New York. The expected number of teams to launch league play in 2011 was announced as 18–20, alongside the announcement of the Wilmington Hammerheads joining the league.

The Los Angeles Blues, associated with the successful women's Pali Blues organization, were added on December 7, 2010, with a message of future "Western Conference" growth into 2012.
The "Caribbean Division" of USL Pro grew to four teams on December 9, 2010, with the addition of Puerto Rico United to the league, marking the last of the 15 teams that would compete in USL Pro in its inaugural 2011 season.

On September 14, 2010, United Soccer Leagues President Tim Holt expressed the desired structure for the league to launch with 14–18 teams across four specific geographic areas in 2011, expansion to 22–26 teams by 2013, and 28–32 teams by 2015.

Following USL Pro's first annual general meeting, the league confirmed it would debut with 16 teams playing a 24-game regular season schedule in 2011, with planned growth for 20–24 teams to start the 2012 season.

Play begins (2011–2012)

USL Pro debuted in 2011, starting with 15 teams playing a 24-game regular season schedule.
American and National Division teams played a home-and-away series against all opponents from the two divisions (totaling 18 games), 2 additional regional rivalry matches, with each team making an additional trip to either Los Angeles or the Caribbean to play two games while hosting International Division competition for two games.
International Division teams played each team in their division four times (twice home, twice away, totaling 16 games) while traveling to face American or National Division opponents in four games and hosting those opponents for four games.

The original playoff format saw eight teams compete in a one-game quarterfinal. Both the American and National Divisions saw their top three teams advance for an inter-divisional playoff, while the top two teams in the International Division played-off against each other to reach the semi-finals. The four remaining teams were re-seeded for a single semi-final match, again with the higher seed hosting, leading up to a single match for the USL Cup. In all playoff matches the highest seeded team hosted.

The first league game was played on April 2, 2011. The Richmond Kickers defeated Orlando City SC 2-0 at Richmond's City Stadium. Stanley Nyazamba scored the first goal in the 35th minute on a penalty kick.

On May 10, 2011, early in the league's inaugural season, the league announced that it was dropping the three Puerto Rican clubs from the USL Pro schedule.
The PRSL clubs were dropped due to economic and ownership issues. The two remaining International Division teams – Antigua Barracuda FC and Los Angeles Blues – were re-aligned into the American and National Divisions.
Due to the removal of the International Division, the revised playoff format featured the top four teams in each of the two divisions. The two division playoff winners met in the USL Pro Championship at the home venue of the team with the better record.

Following the 2011 season, USL Pro announced with the release of the 2012 season schedule that F.C. New York would not be returning to play, with the former National and American Divisions being dissolved to form a single, eleven team league table.

Beginnings of MLS partnership (2013–2014)

Two expansion teams joined for the 2013 season: Phoenix FC and the VSI Tampa Bay FC.

On January 23, 2013, the United Soccer Leagues and the Major League Soccer announced a multi-year agreement to integrate MLS Reserve League play with USL Pro teams, first through team affiliations and "interleague" play, but eventually fully merging MLS Reserves into the USL Pro structure. The stated goals of this partnership are to improve North American player development, strengthen league competition, build long-term ties between the leagues and expand the audience for both the leagues and developing players.

While the 2013 season would feature partnered competitions between USL Pro and MLS Reserve teams, four Major League Soccer clubs opted to affiliate with an existing USL Pro team, agreeing to loan at least four MLS players to their affiliate: Sporting Kansas City with Orlando City, the Philadelphia Union with the Harrisburg City Islanders, D.C. United with the Richmond Kickers and the New England Revolution with the Rochester Rhinos. Each MLS club will eventually be expected to either affiliate with a USL Pro team or operate an independent reserve team in the league. The Houston Dynamo announced that they would be partnering with the Pittsburgh Riverhounds in 2014. However, this partnership between the Riverhounds and Dynamo was dissolved after just one year. Following the conclusion of the 2013 season, VSI Tampa Bay folded after only one season, along with founding league member Antigua.

In December 2012, Sacramento announced it would begin play in 2014 as an expansion team, and in July 2014, USL announced that Oklahoma City would also join USL in 2014.
Orlando City announced that it would leave USL after the 2014 season to join MLS as an expansion team for the 2015 season. The Los Angeles Blues were rebranded as Orange County Blues FC on February 5, 2014. The Phoenix FC franchise was revoked and replaced with Arizona United SC on March 13, 2014.

In what would become a major trend, on January 29, 2014, the LA Galaxy announced the creation of LA Galaxy II, a reserve team within the club's existing development structure. The Galaxy purchased a USL Pro expansion franchise and became the first MLS club to enter its reserve team into the USL Pro.

Expansion of MLS partnership and first rebranding (2015–2016)

USL Pro nearly doubled the number of teams in the league for 2015 in large part due to MLS franchises following the path taken by the LA Galaxy II. Seven MLS clubs announced the purchase of a USL Pro franchise for their reserve team. These MLS franchises joined four independent expansion teams that were previously announced for Colorado Springs, St. Louis, Tulsa and Austin. Additionally, Orlando City sold its franchise rights to Louisville interests, which unveiled Louisville City FC on June 3, 2014, as an affiliate of the new MLS side. The United Soccer Leagues announced that the Charlotte Eagles would drop to its Premier Development League (PDL), now known as USL League Two, while selling their franchise rights to another Charlotte group, which formed Charlotte Independence for play beginning in 2015. Finally, on December 11, 2014, the Dayton Dutch Lions self-relegated to play in the PDL starting in 2015.

During 2014 and early 2015, the various MLS clubs in conjunction with the USL announced seven new franchises that would be owned or controlled by MLS team ownership, and would all begin play in 2015. On September 10, 2014, Real Salt Lake revealed the name of their previously announced USL Pro affiliate team would be Real Monarchs, and confirmed that the team would begin play in 2015.
The team played at Rio Tinto Stadium until the 5,000-seat Zions Bank Stadium was built in Herriman, Utah. Both the Portland Timbers and Seattle Sounders FC created their own USL Pro squads, Portland Timbers 2 and Seattle Sounders FC 2 on October 14, 2014. The Montreal Impact announced that it would field a USL Pro team in September 2014. On November 18, 2014, FC Montreal officially joined the league. 
On November 20, 2014, Toronto FC announced that it would also field a team, subsequently named Toronto FC II, for the 2015 season. 
Whitecaps FC 2 joined USL Pro the next day. 
After discussing plans for a USL Pro team in 2015, 
then postponing those plans in September, the New York Red Bulls announced that their USL Pro team, New York Red Bulls II would begin play in 2015.

MLS affiliations were announced for the remaining MLS teams that did not have an affiliation in 2014 and did not elect to purchase a USL Pro franchise. On September 18, 2014, the Colorado Rapids announced an affiliation partnership with the Charlotte Independence. On January 16, 2015 New York City FC announced that it would have an affiliate relationship with the Wilmington Hammerheads and the Chicago Fire announced their affiliation with St Louis. On February 9, 2015, FC Dallas announced it would add Arizona United SC as its USL Pro affiliate. As a result, all 20 MLS teams for the 2015 season were either fielding their own team in the USL Pro or were affiliated with an independent USL Pro club.

The league also announced in 2015 that the league would be divided into two conferences. Teams would play a 28-game schedule with 22 games against all the teams in their conference, and the teams would be further assigned to four-club subdivisions for the other six games with an eye towards geographic rivalries between clubs.

On February 10, 2015, United Soccer Leagues announced a branding change for the league. It would now be called the United Soccer League or "USL" for short. They introduced a new logo and branding, and stated their intention to apply for Division II status within the United States Soccer Federation hierarchy.

During the 2015 season, USL announced several expansion teams for the 2016 season. The 25th franchise was awarded to Lone Star, LLC and the team would be named Rio Grande Valley FC. In a first for the USL, the team has a "hybrid" affiliation with the Houston Dynamo, who are responsible for the tactical part of the club, while the ownership group, Lone Star, is responsible for operations and management. FC Cincinnati was added as the 26th franchise and Bethlehem Steel FC, in the Lehigh Valley area and owned by the Philadelphia Union, became the 27th, Orlando City B (owned by Orlando City SC) as the 29th, the Swope Park Rangers (owned by Sporting Kansas City) as the 30th, and San Antonio FC as the 31st.

The Austin Aztex announced that they would go on hiatus for the 2016 USL season on October 2, 2015. Floods damaging House Park midway through the 2015 season forced the team to relocate to a high school facility. The team was intended to return in 2017, pending construction of a new, soccer-specific stadium. However, stadium and ownership issues continued to plague the franchise, and they did not return.

Division II sanctioning and second rebranding (2017–2019)

Expansion continued for the 2017 season with Reno 1868 FC, which had been announced during the 2015 season as the 28th franchise, starting play. On October 25, 2016, the USL added two teams from the North American Soccer League (NASL): the Tampa Bay Rowdies and Ottawa Fury FC. This was the first time a club moved from the NASL to the USL. The Montreal Impact also announced that it would fold its USL team, FC Montreal, in favor of affiliating with Ottawa Fury FC.

On August 31, 2016, Kyle Eng sold his majority share of Arizona United SC to an investment group led by Berke Bakay and was rebranded as Phoenix Rising FC. Ivory Coast Soccer Legend Didier Drogba later purchased a share of the team and played the final two seasons of his career there.

On January 6, 2017, the U.S. Soccer board of directors voted to grant provisional Division II status to the USL for the 2017 season, placing the league on the same tier as the North American Soccer League. The NASL was also downgraded from Division II sanctioning to a provisional status because its membership decreased below the 12-team minimum. Following the 2017 season, the USL gained two more NASL teams: Indy Eleven and North Carolina FC. For the 2018 season, the NASL's provisional sanctioning was not renewed by U.S. Soccer, while the USL was granted full sanctioning under Division II on a year-to-year basis. The NASL sued U.S. Soccer, asking a court to order U.S. Soccer to grant NASL Division II status, but the request was denied by the trial court, and denied again by the appeals court.

The USL's expansion efforts continued in the 2018 season with the additions of Nashville SC, Las Vegas Lights FC, Fresno FC (affiliated with the Vancouver Whitecaps FC) and Atlanta United 2 (owned by Atlanta United FC). The league also lost Orlando City B and the Rochester Rhinos, which each announced a hiatus, while the Whitecaps FC 2 were folded after its parent team in Vancouver decided to no longer run its own development team and affiliated with the new Fresno expansion.

Four teams left the USL top flight after the 2018 season. The ownership group of FC Cincinnati was awarded an MLS franchise that started play under the FC Cincinnati name in 2019. Penn FC, the Richmond Kickers, and Toronto FC II voluntarily dropped to USL League One, a new third-level league that United Soccer Leagues launched in 2019. The Kickers and Toronto FC II began League One play in 2019; Penn FC suspended professional operations for 2019 and will resume play in League One in 2020. In addition, the announced hiatuses for both the Rhinos and Orlando City B became permanent departures. The Rhinos originally announced they would extend their hiatus through 2019 before resuming play in League One in 2020, but ended up not resuming play until 2022, by which time the club had changed its name to Rochester New York FC and joined the new third-level MLS Next Pro. Orlando City B resumed play in 2019 in League One.

The league also approved several other expansion locations in Austin, Birmingham, Memphis, Chicago, Oakland East Bay, Hartford, Albuquerque, El Paso, Loudoun County, Virginia, and San Diego. All of these teams began play in 2019 except for San Diego, which began play in the 2020 season; Chicago and East Bay were both announced to launch by 2021, but were indefinitely put on hold when they had issues in securing stadium plans.

Recent history (2020–present)

Following the end of the 2019 season, three teams left the USL Championship. Nashville SC was awarded a Major League Soccer franchise, Fresno FC announced that they would not be returning to Fresno, and Ottawa Fury FC announced that they would be suspending operations after not receiving sanctioning to remain in USL by CONCACAF and U.S. Soccer. An expansion team was announced for the New York City borough of Queens to be named Queensboro FC. On December 11, the Ottawa Fury announced the sale of its franchise rights to the ownership group of Miami FC, with Miami set to participate in the 2020 USL Championship season. This marked the entrance of another former NASL team into the league, with Miami having previously spent time in NPSL and the National Independent Soccer Association (NISA) after the NASL folded.

Saint Louis FC folded at the end of the 2020 season. The city is set to receive an MLS franchise, with St. Louis City SC set to start play in 2023. A spokesperson for SLFC told Sports Illustrated in August of that year, "The ownership decided that with the financial impact of COVID-19 and MLS on the horizon, it didn’t make sense to continue operations." Also at the end of the 2020 season, two MLS clubs, the Philadelphia Union and Portland Timbers, withdrew their reserve sides, Philadelphia Union II and Portland Timbers 2, from the United Soccer League system. The proposed East Bay club's bid had faltered due to stadium issues and its USL franchise rights were purchased by Oakland Roots SC, which had previously played in the NISA, with plans to debut in the USLC for the 2021 season. On November 6, 2020, Reno 1868 FC announced it was ceasing operations as a result of the financial and operational impacts of COVID-19. On January 10, 2021, North Carolina FC club chairman Stephen Malik announced that the club would make a "strategic move" to USL League One.

On February 1, 2021, Monterey Bay FC joined the USL Championship. Monterey Bay FC is a continuation of the USL Championship's Fresno FC franchise. Fresno FC, the original club owned by Ray Beshoff, ceased operations after the 2019 season because he was unable to secure construction of a soccer-specific stadium. Beshoff, however, retained the franchise rights and managed to land the franchise to play their home matches at Cardinale Stadium on the campus of California State University, Monterey Bay in Seaside, California. On November 13, 2021, it was announced that Detroit City would join the USL Championship for the 2022 USL Championship season, becoming the third NISA team to join the league after Miami FC and Oakland Roots SC. On December 2, 2021, Charlotte Independence decided to drop down to the third tier USL League One for 2022, with the goal of better serving its youth players, as well as the fact that a new expansion franchise in the city Charlotte FC was joining Major League Soccer that season, with whom several Independence players had signed for. On December 3, 2021, Oklahoma City Energy FC announced that it will temporarily suspend soccer operations and will not compete in the 2022 USL Championship season. The decision comes after Energy FC's home field at Taft Stadium, which is owned and operated by the Oklahoma City Public Schools, will undergo major renovations that directly overlap with the 2022 USL Championship season and will resume play for the 2023 USL Championship season in its temporary home at Taft Stadium.

On December 6, 2021, the Major League Soccer announced MLS Next Pro, a Division III league that would begin play in 2022. All MLS clubs with reserve teams in USL Championship or USL League One would be moving their affiliated teams to MLS Next Pro by 2023, with the exception of Loudoun United FC. On December 10, 2021, the USL Championship has approved a new ownership group for USL Championship club Austin Bold FC. The new ownership group consists of Donnie Nelson, Neil Leibman, and Bobby Epstein. The team did not participate in the 2022 USL Championship season as it actively seeks relocation to another city in Texas.

On January 27, 2022, the USL officially awarded USL Pro Iowa an expansion team to be based in Des Moines, Iowa, that would join the league in the 2024 season. The team's majority owner is Kyle Krause, who has been the majority owner of USL League 2 side Des Moines Menace since 1998. On July 14, 2022, the USL announced a group that intended to bring USL Championship and Super League teams to New Orleans, Louisiana, with a goal for the Championship side to kick off by 2025. On August 12, 2022, ground was broken in Pawtucket, Rhode Island, on a stadium intended for a USL Championship expansion side that will begin play in 2024 when the stadium is completed. On August 30, 2022, the USL announced that a group of investors had formed to bring USL Championship and USL Super League expansion teams to Jacksonville, Florida, with the goal for the Championship side to kick off in 2025. On October 19, 2022, the USL awarded an expansion team to USL Milwaukee, set to begin play in 2025 with plans to build an 8,000-seat stadium in Milwaukee, Wisconsin.

Teams

The following teams will play in the 2023 USL Championship season.

Expansion teams 

Notes

On hiatus

Former teams

Timeline 

‡ Puerto Rico clubs Puerto Rico United, River Plate Puerto Rico, and Sevilla Puerto Rico began play in the league, but in May 2011 United Soccer Leagues announced that the teams would not finish the season due to financial difficulties.

Competition format
USL Pro's scheduling format changed for the 2015 season to accommodate the expansion that took place during the 2014–2015 off-season, and the league's resulting need to divide teams into conferences – which eliminated the single table.

All teams played 28 regular-season matches stretching from March to September. This included a 22-game, double-round-robin schedule that pitted each team against all its conference opponents at home and on the road. The remaining six fixtures were played against regional rivals, which lead to some inter-conference regular season matches. The top six finishers in each conference went through to the October playoffs, which continued as a series of single-game knockout rounds. After three rounds of intra-conference play, the two conference champions met in the championship match, to be hosted by the team with the better regular-season record. For 2016 season the season was extended to 30 games.

Starting with the 2019 season, teams will play regular-season games only within their conference. Each team will play a home-and-home schedule within its conference, resulting in a 34-game schedule. The top 10 teams from each conference will qualify for the playoffs, which will continue to be held with separate brackets for each conference and conducted entirely as one-off knockout matches. The opening round, which the league calls the "play-in round", sees the bottom four teams in action, with the 7 seed hosting the 10 seed and 8 hosting 9. The survivors join the top six sides from their respective conferences, with the lowest remaining seed visiting the 1 seed and the other play-in survivor visiting the 2 seed. All matches through the conference finals will be hosted by the higher seed. The USL Cup will be the season's only match that involves teams from different conferences; it will be hosted by the conference champion with the better regular-season record.

Media coverage
The USL has been partnered with ESPN since the 2016 season. The first iteration of the deal brought 20 matches to ESPN3 and the championship match to one of its linear networks, while all remaining matches were broadcast directly by the league on its YouTube channel.

Beginning with the launch of ESPN+ on April 12, 2018, all USL matches moved to the over-the-top service, with 18 games of the week and the championship continuing to air on one of ESPN's linear channels. The 2019 final will also air on ESPN Deportes. The deal with ESPN expired after the 2019 season, but was subsequently renewed for three additional seasons. Although the ESPN+ match streams are not blacked out in-market, individual clubs are also allowed to syndicate the USL-produced broadcast to local television stations.

The English-language commentary team for the USL Championship on ESPN has included Mike Watts and Devon Kerr since 2018.  Watts and Kerr also host a weekly program, "USL All-Access" on Sirius XM FC. Broadcasts on ESPN Deportes have been led by Jesús Eduardo Acosta and José Armando Rodriguez.

In August 2020, the USL announced their first international broadcast partner with Caribbean broadcaster Flow Sports.

In August 2021, the USL announced a new broadcast agreement with OneFootball in Italy.

Champions
Teams that no longer participate in the USL Championship are in italics.

USL Championship Final results

USL club honors
Updated to the end of the 2022 USL playoffs; sorted by major honors (championships).

Player records

Attendance

FC Cincinnati played before a record crowd of 20,497 at Nippert Stadium on April 16, 2016, in a rivalry match against neighboring Louisville City FC. This broke the USL Pro's previous record for attendance at a regular-season match of 20,231 set by Sacramento Republic in its home debut on April 26, 2014, at Hughes Stadium. Cincinnati broke the record again on May 14, 2016, with a new all-time high of 23,375. Cincinnati broke the single game attendance record again on October 2, 2016, in their first ever playoff match against the Charleston Battery, losing 2–1 in the quarterfinals of the 2016 USL playoffs. The attendance of 30,187 also set the USL playoff record. Cincinnati broke the all time regular season record again on August 5, 2017, at Nippert Stadium, drawing 25,308 versus Orlando City B. They broke their own record again about six weeks later drawing 30,417 to a 4–2 win over the New York Red Bulls II. Cincinnati broke the record once more in their final home regular season game as a USL team on September 29, 2018, drawing 31,478 versus Indy Eleven

See also

 Soccer in the United States
 Soccer in Canada
 Professional sports leagues in the United States

References

External links

 

 
1
3
Second level association football leagues in North America
Third level association football leagues in North America
Professional soccer leagues in the United States
Summer association football leagues
Professional sports leagues in the United States
Sports leagues established in 2011
2011 establishments in the United States